Tony Greenstein is a British  left-wing activist and writer. An anti-fascist and former squatter, he was a founder member of the Palestine Solidarity Campaign and stood for parliament as a representative of the Alliance for Green Socialism. In 2018, he was expelled from the Labour Party for "harassment" and "abusive language", following accusations of antisemitism.

Early life  
Greenstein grew up in Liverpool. He was raised in an Orthodox Jewish family and his father was Rabbi Solomon Greenstein, who opposed Oswald Mosley's British Union of Fascists at the Battle of Cable Street in 1936. He moved to Brighton to study Maths and Chemistry at Brighton Polytechnic and was elected vice-president of the student union. In 1974, he became involved in housing activism alongside Steve Bassam and squatted in derelict hotels before negotiating a licence to live at Lansdowne Place. 

In 1980, he was one of the founders of the Brighton Campaign Against Youth Unemployment and he was also involved with anti-fascist campaigns. Greenstein actively opposed the far-right National Front and neo-nazi British Movement in Brighton during the 1970s, 1980s and 1990s, as a member of the Brighton & Hove Anti-Fascist Committee and Anti Fascist Action. In more recent years he has been involved in campaigning against far-right groups such as the British National Party, English Defence League and March for England (MfE) in the city.

Career 
In 2013, Greenstein was secretary of the Brighton and Hove Unemployed Workers Centre, a community centre in Hollingdean. He was a founder member of the Palestine Solidarity Campaign and in the 1980s, he ran the Labour Movement Campaign for Palestine. In 2005, he stood unsuccessfully for parliament in the Brighton Pavilion constituency for the Alliance for Green Socialism, getting 188 votes. 

Greenstein was barred from joining the Labour Party in 2015 and then joined after the election of Jeremy Corbyn as leader. He was suspended in 2016 regarding accusations of antisemitism and then expelled in February 2018 after a review by Labour's National Constitutional Committee. In 2019, Greenstein sued the Campaign Against Antisemitism for libel over its claim that he was a "notorious antisemite". The High Court dismissed the claim in 2020. Greenstein had previously co-founded Labour Against the Witchhunt and told a Jewish Voice for Labour meeting during the 2018 Labour Party Conference that charges of antisemitism in the UK Labour Party were designed to destabilise Corbyn.

In December 2021 it was reported that he had been given a two-year restraining order, banning him from contacting the Labour Party disputes team.

Selected works 
 The Fight Against Fascism in Brighton & the South Coast Brighton: Brighton History Workshop. 2011. 
 Zionism: Antisemitism’s twin in Jewish garb
 Zionism During the Holocaust  London: New Generation Publishing. 2022.

References 

Year of birth missing (living people)
People from Liverpool
20th-century squatters
20th-century English male writers
21st-century English writers
20th-century English historians
Politicians from Brighton and Hove
English anti-fascists
English Jewish writers
Jewish anti-Zionism in the United Kingdom
Jewish English activists
Jewish anti-fascists
21st-century English historians
Living people
Politicians affected by a party expulsion process
Alumni of the University of Brighton
Palestinian solidarity activists

External links 

Tony Greenstein's blog